Greater London is one of the largest urban areas in Europe, with an area of 1,572 km2 (607 sq mi). Its boundaries were set in 1965 when Greater London, which covers the 32 London boroughs and the City of London, was created. Almost two-thirds of it is green space and wetlands. Its population according to the 2011 census was 8.17 million.

Local nature reserve (LNR) is a statutory designation by local authorities which gives protection to wildlife habitats and natural features. It allows local authorities to apply local bye-laws to manage and protect sites. The local authority must have a legal interest in the site, by owning or leasing it or having a nature reserve agreement with the owner. As of January 2016, Natural England gives details of 144 local nature reserves declared by local authorities in Greater London, which are listed below.

The longest is Parkland Walk, a linear site of   along the route of an old railway line. Perivale Wood is one of the oldest nature reserves in Britain. It has been managed by the Selborne Society since 1902, and was designated an LNR in 1974. The newest LNRs are Coldfall Wood, Alexandra Palace and Park and Masons Field, all declared in 2013. Several sites, including Camley Street Natural Park in Kings Cross and Frays Valley, are managed by the London Wildlife Trust.

Sites

Map of London boroughs

See also
List of local nature reserves in England
List of national nature reserves in England
List of Sites of Special Scientific Interest in Greater London
Parks and open spaces in London

Notes

References

External links

LNR Designated Sites list for Greater London at Natural England

Greater London

Local